The UEFA European Under-18 Championship 1970 Final Tournament was held in Scotland.

Qualification

Group 1

Group 2

|}

Group 3

Group 4

Group 5

Group 6

|}

Teams
The following teams entered the tournament. Six teams qualified (Q) and ten teams entered without playing qualification matches.

 
 
  (Q)
 
  (Q)
  (Q)
 
 
 
 
  (Q)
  (host)
 
 
  (Q)
  (Q)

Group stage

Group A

Group B

Group C

Group D

Semifinals

Third place match

Final

External links
Results by RSSSF

UEFA European Under-19 Championship
International association football competitions hosted by Scotland
Under-18
Under-18
UEFA European Under-18 Championship
1970 in youth association football